The women's 15000 metres elimination races event at the 2017 Summer Universiade was held on 22 August at the Yingfeng Riverside Park Roller Sports Rink (A).

Record

Final 

Note: ELN=Eliminated on N th lab.

References 

Roller sports at the 2017 Summer Universiade